Éric Prodon chose to not defend his last year's title.

Benoît Paire won the title after defeating Maxime Teixeira in the final, when he was leading 6–4, 3–0 and Maxime retired.

Seeds

Draw

Finals

Top half

Bottom half

References
 Main Draw
 Qualifying Draw

Ropharma Brasov Challenger - Singles
BRD Brașov Challenger